A Fifth of Funk is the fifth and final installment of the George Clinton Family Series collection by Parliament-Funkadelic collective members. The album was released in Japan in 1993 by P-Vine Records, and later in the same year by AEM Records in the United States and Sequel Records in the United Kingdom. The compilation's producer and P-Funk leader George Clinton gives his final thoughts about the tracks on the album, as well as his feelings on the entire Family Series project, for A Fifth of Funks final track.  The title is a play on words of Beethoven's  Symphony No. 5, as well as Walter Murphy's 1976 disco hit "A Fifth of Beethoven".

Track listing
Song credits for A Fifth of Funk adapted from album liner notes.
 "Flatman and Bobin"
 Artist: Parliament (1978) Producer: George Clinton
 Drums: Tyrone Lampkin
 Bass: Bootsy Collins
 Keyboards: Bernie Worrell
 Guitars: Garry Shider
 Horns: Horny Horns
 "Count Funkula (I Didn't Know That Funk Was Loaded)"
 Artist: Lonnie Greene (1980) Producers: Ron Dunbar, Lonnie Greene
 Drums: Lonnie Greene
 Bass: Donnie Sterling
 Guitars: Tony Thomas
 "Thumparella (Oh Kay)"
 Artist: Ron Ford (1981) Producer: Ron Ford
 "Eyes of a Dreamer"
 Artist: Jessica Cleaves (1981) Producer: Ron Dunbar
 "I Found You"
 Artist: Phillippe Wynne (1981) Producer: Phillippe Wynne, Ron Dunbar
 Background Vocals: Brandie (Telma Hopkins, Joyce Vincent)
 "Ice Melting in Your Heart"
 Artist: Brides of Funkenstein (1977) Producer: Ron Dunbar
 Drums: Tyrone Lampkin
 Bass: Junie Morrison
 Guitars: Junie Morrison, Garry Shider
 Keyboards: Bernie Worrell
 "Clone Ranger"
 Artist: Trey Lewd's Flastic Brain Flam (1978)
 Producers: Gary Shider, George Clinton
 Drums: Tony Davis
 Bass: Stevie Pannall
 Guitars: Garry Shider, DeWayne McKnight
 Background Vocals: Brides, Parlet
 "Who Do You Love"
Artist: Bernie Worrell (1978)  Producers: Bernie Worrell, George Clinton
 Drums: Tyrone Lampkin
 Bass: Rodney 'Skeets' Curtis
 Percussion: Larry Fratangelo
 Keyboards: Bernie Worrell
 Guitars: Gary Shider
"Up Up Up and Away"
Artist: Brides of Funkenstein (1979) Producer: Ron Dunbar
 Drums: Jerry Jones
 Bass: Rodnick Chandler
 Guitars: Eddie Willis
 Keyboards: Rudi Robinson, Bernie Worrell
 "Can't Get Over Losing You"
 Artist: Junie Morrison (1978) Producer: Junie Morrison
 All instruments by Junie Morrison
 "Rat Kissed the Cat"
 Artist: George Clinton and Brides of Funkenstein (1977) Producer: George Clinton
 Drums: Tiki Fullwood
 Bass: Billy Bass
 Guitars: Gary Cooper, Garry Shider
 Keyboards: Bernie Worrell
 Horns: Horny Horns
 "Too Tight for Light"
 Artist: Funkadelic (1979) Producer: George Clinton, Junie Morrison
 "Every Little Bit Hurts"
 Artist: George Clinton, Diane Brooks, & Funkadelic (1972)
 Producer: George Clinton
 "Interview - Final Thoughts"
 George Clinton

Notes

References

External links
 A Fifth of Funk at Discogs

George Clinton (funk musician) albums
1993 albums
P-Vine Records albums